The Ashes of Eden is a Star Trek novel co-written by William Shatner, Judith Reeves-Stevens, and Garfield Reeves-Stevens as part of the "Shatnerverse" series of novels. This is Shatner's first Trek collaboration.

The audio adaptation of the book is notable as the first time in the entire Star Trek franchise that the famous phrase "Beam me up, Scotty" is uttered in that form.

Plot summary
The novel opens with Ambassador Spock on planet Veridian III following the events of Star Trek Generations. He is standing at the site where Captain Jean-Luc Picard had buried Captain James T. Kirk, paying final respects to his fallen friend.

The story then flashes back six months before Kirk was believed to have been 'killed' on the maiden voyage of the U.S.S. Enterprise NCC-1701-B.

Kirk is having trouble coping with retirement on Earth as the U.S.S. Enterprise NCC-1701-A is decommissioned for war games. Kirk is having difficulties finding ways to spend his spare time and finds it distasteful that Starfleet cadets are using holodeck simulations of his 'adventures' in training, insisting "they were just my job." Kirk later attends a party at Starfleet Headquarters with his old friends Spock and 'Bones' McCoy, where they are disappointed to learn that the post of Supreme Commander-in-Chief has been awarded to Admiral Androvar Drake (a former colleague of Kirk who has no qualms about cruelly mocking him). Kirk spots a mysterious young alien woman at the party, but doesn't get a chance to talk to her.

Meanwhile, Chekov and Uhura are working undercover with a Starfleet Intelligence operative named Jade in Klingon territory. When Jade manages to obtain some information about something called the "Chalchaj 'Qmey", she betrays Chekov and Uhura, leaving them to die in a shuttle bay. Luckily, they are rescued by Sulu aboard the Excelsior (who have been secretly monitoring them during their mission) and, feeling they can no longer trust Starfleet Intelligence, return to Earth to report to Drake.

Kirk returns to his parents' farm in Iowa, which he intends to sell soon. He is surprised to be reunited with the woman from the party, who gives her name as Teilani and explains that her world needs a hero. Suddenly, they are attacked and Teilani is shot. Kirk and Teilani manage to defeat and apparently kill their attackers, who Teilani explains are anarchists disrupting the peace of her homeworld. This world is called Chal and was originally colonized by both Klingons and Romulans (the inhabitants are all Klingon/Romulan hybrids), but both empires have now abandoned them. Chal apparently has fountain of youth properties, which seem proven when Teilani's wound miraculously heals, and the anarchists want to sell it. Kirk accepts Teilani's offer to help protect Chal, seeing it as a second chance.
Despite protests from Spock and Bones, Kirk resigns from Starfleet and goes to Chal aboard the Enterprise, which Teilani got from the Federation as a 'goodwill gesture', being reunited with Scotty.

When Sulu and the others report to Drake, he informs them about Kirk's resignation. The Chalchaj 'Qmey is believed to be some kind of doomsday weapon and Drake warns that there is a conspiracy within Starfleet trying to undermine peace talks with the Klingon Empire. Kirk and the Enterprise may be intended to help use this weapon against the Federation, so the group (now joined by Spock and Bones) are dispatched to find Chal and the weapon. After they leave, it is revealed that 'Jade' is actually Drake's daughter Ariadne, and that Drake is manipulating Kirk, his former crew and Teilani to get the Chalchaj 'Qmey for himself.

Kirk arrives on Chal and quickly learns why its name is Klingon for 'heaven' - he starts feeling younger and more alive. The anarchists attack the power station in the center of Chal's only city and Teilani reveals that they are the older generation of her people - her group are fighting their own parents. Scotty puts down the attack from orbit, but starts to question the morality of the situation, so Kirk tells him about Chal's rejuvenation powers. However, Scotty does not believe him, leaving Kirk wondering if his revitalization and love for Teilani is just him denying his age. Later that night, Kirk leads a raid on the anarchists' camp and, having somehow survived being shot at point-blank range, takes a prisoner to the Enterprise brig for questioning. The prisoner, named Torl, explains that the people themselves are the Chalchaj 'Qmey, the 'Children of Heaven', and that the anarchists want to destroy their world's legacy, not sell it. Torl is shot dead by Teilani before he can tell Kirk more.

Kirk realizes that things aren't how they seemed and confronts Teilani. The 'attackers' from the farm actually work for Teilani (they stopped their hearts to fake death) and Teilani faked her wound. She also secretly equipped Kirk with a force field emitter to prevent him being shot. Kirk declares he only came to Chal for the challenge of saving a world and he is not in love with Teilani, breaking her heart. They are suddenly called to the Enterprise as the Excelsior (now joined by Drake and a Klingon escort) arrives in orbit. Despite being equipped with only outdated Klingon disruptors (Starfleet stripped down the Enterprise prior to giving it to Chal) Kirk engages and manages to destroy one of the Klingon ships, causing Drake to angrily order the destruction of Kirk's ship. However, Kirk and his former crew agree that Drake's orders are against Starfleet protocol and the Excelsior withdraws for a general inquiry.

Kirk and Teilani transport to the power station to find out the true secret of Chal. Lights and information displays are activated by Teilani's life signs, revealing that the power station actually contains weapons and that the Chalchaj 'Qmey were genetically created from not only Klingons and Romulans, but also stolen human tissue samples. Teilani is horrified, believing her people are little more than weapons themselves, but Kirk (who is shocked by a display depicting monstrous Starfleet agents brutally murdering Klingons and Romulans), discovers that they were actually created to be able to survive the contaminated environments the two empires believed would become the norm if the Federation conquered them. He comforts Teilani, assuring her that no-one can be held responsible for the world they are born into and that the important thing is to work to make the future better. Ariadne suddenly transports in, revealing that she and her father hope to make use of the Chalchaj 'Qmey by using them as living donor banks, using transplants from them to make immortality available to the Federation. She also tries to turn Teilani against Kirk, telling her that Kirk only came to Chal to gain immortality, but Kirk (who insists that his 'rejuvenation' was all in his mind) convinces Teilani to stop her heart. This puts the lights out, allowing Kirk to steal Ariadne's gun and use it to destroy the items and information so it can never fall into the wrong hands.

Drake then arrives, explaining his intent to secure the future of the Federation by provoking them into all-out war with the Klingon Empire and devastating the latter. Refusing to accept Drake's vision of the future, Kirk and Teilani transport back to the Enterprise and are surprised to find all the old crew there awaiting Kirk's orders (having figured out Drake is the true head of the 'conspiracy'). Drake returns to the remaining Klingon ship, but instead of engaging in a fair fight orders it into a slingshot maneuver around Chal's sun, hoping to go back in time and kill Kirk the day he arrived. With Sulu at the helm, the Enterprise manages to prevent this, but both ships get trapped in the sun. Drake refuses to attempt escape until Kirk is dead, gleefully watching as the Enterprise explodes. However, Kirk and the others actually survived by transporting to the Excelsior at the last minute. Kirk advises Drake to drop his ship's shields so he and his crew can be saved, but Drake refuses and his ship is destroyed as they try to escape. Teilani is confused, noting that Drake believed Kirk and wondering why he refused help. Kirk explains "He was once a starship captain. And starship captains believe they're invincible . . . they have to be. It's their job."

Kirk visits Chal one last time, giving Teilani the Enterprise'''s dedication plaque (which he had ripped off the wall of the exploding bridge prior to its destruction) for safekeeping and advising her to tell her children about him. Back in Federation space, Kirk, Spock and Bones watch the construction of a new Enterprise and note how Drake's position will probably now be offered to Kirk. Kirk laughs at this, insisting that the adventure they've just had is proof he's not suitable. Bones reminds Kirk of how he's a living legend and how simulations of his adventures will be seen by Starfleet cadets for centuries to come. Kirk comments "I only hope they enjoy those adventures as much as I did", realizing that this way, he really will live forever.

The novel then flashes 80 years into the future. Spock is still at Kirk's gravesite when the bright flash of phaser fire illuminates the night sky directly above him, where the U.S.S. Farragut is orbiting the planet, leading salvage operations of the crashed remains of the U.S.S. Enterprise NCC-1701-D. One stream of phaser fire is consistent with starfleet-type weaponry, and the other is green, clearly alien in origin. Spock conjectures that the Farragut is engaged in combat.

Suddenly a strong gust of wind envelops the gravesite, and Spock hears the unmistakable sound of a transporter beam activating, as Kirk's grave glows through the rocks from within. The grave then collapses in on itself, and the gust of wind stops.

Spock looks up towards the stars, unsure of what has just transpired, or why.

Characters
 James T. Kirk
 Spock
 Leonard McCoy
 Scotty
 Hikaru Sulu
 Pavel Chekov
 Uhura
 William Riker
 Carol Marcus
 Androvar Drake
 Galt
 Faith Morgan
 Teilani

Production
Following the publication of their book Federation, Judith and Garfield Reeves-Stevens were contacted by Pocket Books editor Kevin Ryan. He was asking about whether they would be interested in collaborating with William Shatner on a new book. Shatner had just completed filming as James T. Kirk on the film Star Trek Generations which showed the death of his character. Both Shatner and Pocket Books wanted the character's story to continue in novel form. The novel was set immediately prior to the events of Generations. After the trio submitted the manuscript to Pocket Books, the response was positive and wanted to know if a sequel was possible.

Comics
DC Comics published a one-shot graphic novel adaptation of this novel in 1995, with writing credit of William Shatner with Judith & Garfield Reeves-Stevens.

Release details
 William Shatner, Judith Reeves-Stevens and Garfield Reeves-Stevens, The Ashes of Eden (Star Trek), Pocket Books June 1995, Hardcover
 William Shatner, Judith Reeves-Stevens and Garfield Reeves-Stevens, The Ashes of Eden (Star Trek), Star Trek''; Reissue edition 1996, Paperback

References

External links

 https://web.archive.org/web/20070102124243/http://www.well.com/~sjroby/lcars/1995.html

1995 American novels
Novels based on Star Trek: The Original Series
Novels based on Star Trek: The Next Generation
Novels by William Shatner
Novels by Judith and Garfield Reeves-Stevens
American science fiction novels
Pocket Books books
Novels set in the 23rd century